Roderick Ainsworth was a member of the Wisconsin State Assembly.

Biography
Ainsworth was born in DuPage County, Illinois in 1842. He moved to Wisconsin in 1844. Ainsworth died at his home in Waukesha, Wisconsin in October 1925.

Career
Ainsworth was a member of the Assembly from 1901 to 1908. He was a Republican.

References

External links

The Political Graveyard

People from DuPage County, Illinois
Politicians from Waukesha, Wisconsin
Republican Party members of the Wisconsin State Assembly
1842 births
1925 deaths
Burials in Wisconsin